Lansdale Ghiselin Sasscer (September 30, 1893 – November 5, 1964) represented the fifth district of the state of Maryland in the United States House of Representatives for seven terms from 1939 to 1953.

Sasscer was born in Upper Marlboro, Maryland, and graduated from Dickinson School of Law in Carlisle, Pennsylvania in 1914. He was admitted to the bar the same year and commenced practice in Upper Marlboro. During World War I, he served from 1917 to 1919, being overseas for thirteen months as a first lieutenant in the Fifty-ninth Artillery of the United States Army.

After the War, Sasscer resumed the practice of law, and served as a member of the Maryland State Senate from 1922 to 1938, serving as President of the Senate in 1935 and 1937. He was delegate to the 1924 and 1936 Democratic National Conventions, and vice chairman of the committee on reorganization of the State government in 1939.

Sasscer was elected as a Democrat to the U.S. Congress to fill the vacancy left open as a result of the death of Stephen Gambrill, serving from February 3, 1939, to January 3, 1953. Sasscer chose not to run for re-election in 1952, and instead attempted to win election to the United States Senate seat being vacated by Herbert O'Conor, but lost the nomination to George P. Mahoney. Afterwards, he resumed the practice of law in Upper Marlboro, Maryland.

Family
Sasscer's family has lived in Upper Marlboro since the 1760s.

Sasscer married Agnes Goffren in 1919 and had three children, Agnes Lansdale "Dolly" Sasscer, Lucy Claggett Sasscer and Lansdale Ghiselin Sasscer, Jr.

Sasscer was a resident of Upper Marlboro until his death there in 1964.  He is interred in Trinity Episcopal Church Cemetery in Upper Marlboro, Maryland.

References

External links
 
 Retrieved on 2008-02-10

1893 births
1964 deaths
20th-century American politicians
United States Army personnel of World War I
Democratic Party members of the United States House of Representatives from Maryland
Dickinson School of Law alumni
Maryland lawyers
Democratic Party Maryland state senators
Military personnel from Maryland
People from Upper Marlboro, Maryland
Presidents of the Maryland State Senate
United States Army officers
20th-century American lawyers